Events from the year 2012 in Michigan.

Office holders

State office holders

 Governor of Michigan: Rick Snyder (Republican)
 Lieutenant Governor of Michigan: Brian Calley (Republican) 
 Michigan Attorney General: Bill Schuette (Republican)
 Michigan Secretary of State: Ruth Johnson (Republican)
 Speaker of the Michigan House of Representatives: Jase Bolger (Republican)
 Majority Leader of the Michigan Senate: Randy Richardville (Republican)
 Chief Justice, Michigan Supreme Court: Robert P. Young Jr.

Mayors of major cities
 Mayor of Detroit: Dave Bing (Democrat)
 Mayor of Grand Rapids: George Heartwell
 Mayor of Warren, Michigan: James R. Fouts
 Mayor of Ann Arbor: John Hieftje (Democrat)
 Mayor of Lansing: Virgil Bernero
 Mayor of Flint: Dayne Walling

Federal office holders

 U.S. Senator from Michigan: Debbie Stabenow (Democrat)
 U.S. Senator from Michigan: Carl Levin (Democrat) 
 House District 1: Dan Benishek (Republican)
 House District 2: Bill Huizenga (Republican)
 House District 3: Justin Amash (Republican)
 House District 4: Dave Camp (Republican)
 House District 5: Dale Kildee (Democrat)
 House District 6: Fred Upton (Republican)
 House District 7: Tim Walberg (Republican)
 House District 8: Mike Rogers (Republican)
 House District 9: Sander Levin (Democrat)
 House District 10: Candice Miller (Republican)
 House District 11: David Curson (Democrat)
 House District 12: John Dingell (Democrat)
 House District 13: John Conyers (Democrat)
 House District 14: Gary Peters (Democrat)

Population
In the 2010 United States Census, Michigan was recorded as having a population of 9,883,640 persons, ranking as the eighth most populous state in the country. 

The state's largest cities, having populations of at least 75,000 based on 2016 estimates, were as follows:

Sports

Baseball
 2012 Detroit Tigers season – Under manager Jim Leyland, the Tigers compiled an 88-74 record, finished first in the American League Central, defeated Oakland in the divisional series and the Yankees in the American League Championship Series, and lost to the San Francisco Giants in the 2012 World Series. The team's statistical leaders included Miguel Cabrera with a .330 batting average, 44 home runs, and 139 RBIs, Justin Verlander with 17 wins, and Brayan Villarreal with a 2.63 earned run average
 2012 Michigan Wolverines baseball team - 
 2012 Michigan Wolverines softball team -

American football
 2012 Detroit Lions season – Under coach Jim Schwartz, the Lions compiles a 4-12 record. The team's statistical leaders included Matthew Stafford with 4,967 passing yards, Mikel Leshoure with 798 rushing yards, Calvin Johnson with 1,964 receiving yards, and Jason Hanson with 134 points scored.
 2012 Michigan State Spartans football team - Under head coach Mark Dantonio, the Spartans compiled a 7-6 record. The team's statistical leaders included Andrew Maxwell with 2,606 passing yards, Le'Veon Bell with 1,793 rushing yards, Bennie Fowler with 524 receiving yards, and Dan Conroy with 94 points scored.
 2012 Michigan Wolverines football team - Under head coach Brady Hoke, the Wolverines compiled an 8-5 record. The team's statistical leaders included Denard Robinson with 1,319 passing yards and 1,266 rushing yards, Jeremy Gallon with 829 receiving yards, and Brendan Gibbons with 93 points scored.
 2012 Western Michigan Broncos football team - Under head coach Bill Cubit, the Broncos compiled a 4–8 record.
 2012 Central Michigan Chippewas football team - Under head coach Dan Enos, the Chippewas compiled a 7–6 record.
 2012 Eastern Michigan Eagles football team - Under head coach Ron English, the Eagles compiled a 2–10 record.

Basketball
 2011–12 Detroit Pistons season – Under coach Lawrence Frank, the Pistons compiled a 25-41 record. The team's statistical leaders included Greg Monroe with 1,015 points scored and 637 rebounds and Brandon Knight with 251 assists.
 2011–12 Michigan State Spartans men's basketball team - Under head coach Tom Izzo, the Spartans compiled a 29-8. The team's statistical leaders included Draymond Green with 601 points and 394 rebounds and Keith Appling with 144 assists.
 2011–12 Michigan Wolverines men's basketball team - Under head coach John Beilein, the Wolverines compiled a 24-10 record. The team's statistical leaders included Trey Burke with 504 points and 156 assists and Jordan Morgan with 191 rebounds.
 2011–12 Detroit Titans men's basketball team - Under head coach Ray McCallum, the team compiled a 22–14 record.
 2011–12 Michigan State Spartans women's basketball team - 
 2011–12 Michigan Wolverines women's basketball team -

Ice hockey
 2011–12 Detroit Red Wings season – Under head coach Mike Babcock, the Red Wings compiled a 48-28-6 record and lost to Nashville in the conference quarterfinals. The team's statistical leaders included Henrik Zetterberg with 69 points scored, Johan Franzen with 29 goals, and Pavel Datsyuk with 48 assists.
 2011–12 Michigan Wolverines men's ice hockey team - In their 26th season under head coach Red Berenson, the Wolverines compiled a 24–13–4 record.
 2011–12 Michigan State Spartans men's ice hockey team - Under head coach Tom Anastos, the Spartans compiled a 20–16–4 record.

Racing
 Port Huron to Mackinac Boat Race - 
 Pure Michigan 400 - 
 Detroit Grand Prix -

Other
 Michigan Open -

Music

Chronology of events

January

February

March

April

May

June

July

August

September

October

November
 November 6 – A number of elections occurred, including:
 President of the United States - Incumbent President Barack Obama wins Michigan over Republican nominee Mitt Romney, with 54% of the vote.
 United States Senate - Incumbent U. S. Senator Debbie Stabenow defeats Republican nominee Pete Hoekstra with 58% of the vote.
 United States House of Representatives - Redistricting leaves Michigan with one less congressional district, with no congressional districts switching parties, leaving the Michigan's U.S. House delegation at 9 Republicans and 4 Democrats.
 Michigan House of Representatives - The Michigan House of Representatives has its partisan make up changed from 63 Republicans and 47 Democrats to 59 Republicans and 51 Democrats.
 State Ballot Proposals - Out of six state ballot proposals, none are adopted.

December

Deaths
 February 19 - Vito Giacalone, organized crime figure, at age 78
 April 7 - Mike Wallace, journalist and University of Michigan alumnus, at age 93 in Connecticut
 April 30 - E. J. Potter, dragstrip proponent known as the "Michigan Madman", at age 61 in Ithaca, Michigan
 May 24 - George Ceithaml, Michigan quarterback 1941-42, at age 91 in California
 May 31 - Orlando Woolridge, played for Detroit Pistons (1991–1993), at age 52 in Louisiana
 June 14 - Bob Chappuis, University of Michigan football player finished second in 1947 Heisman voting, inducted into College Football Hall of Fame, at age 89 in Ann Arbor
 July 16 - James F. Goodrich, Under Secretary of the Navy (1981-1987) and native of Jackson, at age 99 in Maine
 July 24 - Chad Everett, actor and Dearborn native, at age 75 in Los Angeles
 August 8 - Fay Ajzenberg-Selove, physicist and Michigan alumnus who won 2007 National Medal of Science, at age 86 in Pennsylvania
 August 29 - Les Moss, manager of Detroit Tigers in 1979 prior to hiring of Sparky Anderson, at age 87 in Florida
 August 31 - Tom Keating, MVP of 1963 Michigan football team, at age 69 in Denver
 September 30 - Clara Stanton Jones, first African-American director of a major city public library, Detroit (1970–1978), at age 99 in California
 October 9 - Budd Lynch, play-by-play broadcaster and later public address announcer for Detroit Red Wings for more than 60 years starting in 1949, at age 95 in Dearborn, Michigan
 October 10 - Alex Karras, football player for Detroit Lions (1958–1970) and actor, inducted into Pro Football Hall of Fame, at age 77 in Los Angeles
 October 11 - Champ Summers, OF/DH for Detroit Tigers (1979–1981), at age 66 in Florida
 October 16 - Eddie Yost, third baseman for Detroit Tigers (1959–1960), at age 86 in Massachusetts
 October 25 - Emanuel Steward, boxing trainer associated with Kronk Gym, at age 68 in Chicago
 November 2 - Joe Ginsberg, catcher for Detroit Tigers (1948, 1950–1953), at age 86 in West Bloomfield, Michigan
 November 5 - Stalking Cat, Flint native known for extreme body modifications to resemble a tigress, at age 54 in Nevada
 November 16 - Helen Milliken, First Lady of Michigan (1969–1983) and women's rights activist, at age 89 in Traverse City
 November 22 - Bennie McRae, football and track star at Michigan, ranked one of the Chicago Bears greatest players, at age 72 in Maryland
 November 29 - Merv Pregulman, All-American player for Michigan in 1943, at age 90 in Tennessee
 December 12 - Eddie "Guitar" Burns, blues musician, at age 84

Gallery of 2012 deaths

See also
 History of Michigan
 History of Detroit

References